Main Ridge may refer to:

 Main Ridge, Victoria, a suburb in Melbourne, Australia.
 The Main Ridge, Tobago, the main mountainous spine of the island of Tobago.